Balanomis is a monotypic snout moth genus described by Edward Meyrick in 1887. Its single species, described in the same publication, Balanomis encyclia, is found in Australia, including New South Wales. This species has also been introduced to New Zealand.

References

External links
Australian Faunal Directory

Moths described in 1887
Cryptoblabini
Monotypic moth genera
Moths of Australia
Pyralidae genera